Danny Murphy (August 20, 1955 – August 8, 2014) was an American actor. He was known for his roles in There's Something About Mary and in Me, Myself & Irene. His last movie role was in Hall Pass. Murphy was born in Boston, Massachusetts.

Murphy was a quadriplegic as the result of a diving accident that took place at Martha's Vineyard on August 8, 1974. His friend and director, Peter Farrelly, was with him at the accident.

Murphy criticized Farrelly for not including disabled people in his movie Dumb & Dumber. This led to Murphy's first movie role in Farrelly's comedy movie Kingpin.

Murphy died in Florida from cancer, aged 58.

References

External links

1955 births
2014 deaths
20th-century American male actors
21st-century American male actors
American male film actors
American people with disabilities
Deaths from cancer in Florida
Male actors from Boston
People with tetraplegia